The District Level Examination (DLE), now known as the Basic Education Examination (BEE), is an Examination taken in District Level especially in Eighth Grade in Nepal. The examination is coordinated by the country's District Education Offices.

Subjects
There are various subjects in Basic Level. Among them some are compulsory and optional.

Compulsory Subjects
Some of the compulsory subjects in the examination are:
 Nepali 
 English 
 Science and Environment 
 Mathematics
 Social Studies and Population Education
 Occupation, Business and Technology Education 
 Moral Education 
 Health and Physical Education

Optional Subjects

Some of the optional subjects are: 
  Sanskrit
  Extra English and other languages 
  Computer Education 
  Geography and History Education
  Extra Mathematics
  Business Education 
  Technology Education
  Office Practice and Accountancy

See also
 Education in Nepal

References

School examinations
Education in Nepal